Jozef "Jos" Dupré (8 July 1928 – 2 December 2021) was a Belgian politician. A member of the Christian Social Party, he served in the Chamber of Representatives from 1974 to 1996, while serving as President briefly in June 1995. He also sat on the Flemish Council from 1980 to 1995.

References

1928 births
2021 deaths
Belgian politicians
Presidents of the Chamber of Representatives (Belgium)
Members of the Chamber of Representatives (Belgium)
Members of the Flemish Parliament
Mayors of places in Belgium
Christian Social Party (Belgium, defunct) politicians
People from Laakdal
People from Westerlo